The Eiffel Tower and Other Mythologies is a collection of essays by the French literary theorist Roland Barthes.  It is a companion volume to his earlier book, Mythologies, and follows the same format of a series of short essays which explore a range of cultural phenomena, from the Tour de France to laundry detergents.

Continental philosophy literature
Contemporary philosophical literature
Literary theory
University of California Press books
Essay collections
1979 books